Iwan Schmid (15 November 1947 – 13 May 2009) was a Swiss cyclist. He competed in the individual road race at the 1972 Summer Olympics.

References

External links
 

1947 births
2009 deaths
Swiss male cyclists
Olympic cyclists of Switzerland
Cyclists at the 1972 Summer Olympics
Sportspeople from the canton of Solothurn
Tour de Suisse stage winners